Alex Fabián Varas Rubio (born March 26, 1976) is a retired Chilean Association football goalkeeper, who last played for Chilean club Santiago Wanderers.  He began his career with Universidad Católica where he played four seasons.  He spent one season with Coquimbo Unido.  Varas spent separate one-year spells with Audax before and after spending four seasons with Santiago Wanderers.

Varas has appeared seven times for the Chile national team.  His international debut was on March 29, 1995, against Mexico.

Honours

Club
Universidad Católica
 Copa Chile (1): 1995
 Primera División de Chile (1): 1997 Apertura

Santiago Wanderers
 Primera División de Chile (1): 2001

Colo-Colo
 Primera División de Chile (2): 2006 Apertura, 2006 Clausura

References

1976 births
Living people
Chilean footballers
Chile international footballers
Santiago Wanderers footballers
Club Deportivo Universidad Católica footballers
Colo-Colo footballers
Audax Italiano footballers
Coquimbo Unido footballers
Universidad de Concepción footballers
Chilean Primera División players
Primera B de Chile players
2004 Copa América players
Association football goalkeepers